The 1982–83 daytime network television schedule for the three major English-language commercial broadcast networks in the United States covers the weekday and weekend daytime hours from September 1982 to August 1983.

Legend

 New series are highlighted in bold.

Schedule
 All times correspond to U.S. Eastern and Pacific Time scheduling (except for some live sports or events). Except where affiliates slot certain programs outside their network-dictated timeslots, subtract one hour for Central, Mountain, Alaska, and Hawaii-Aleutian times.
 Local schedules may differ, as affiliates have the option to pre-empt or delay network programs. Such scheduling may be limited to preemptions caused by local or national breaking news or weather coverage (which may force stations to tape delay certain programs to other timeslots) and any major sports events scheduled to air in a weekday timeslot (mainly during major holidays). Stations may air shows at other times at their preference.

Monday–Friday

Notes
 Sunrise Semester and Captain Kangaroo both left the weekday schedule on CBS on October 1, 1982. Captain Kangaroo moved to Saturday and Sunday mornings and reverted to a one-hour format.
 Texas and The Doctors both ended their runs on NBC on December 31, 1982.

Saturday

In the News aired ten times during CBS' Saturday morning shows.

Ask NBC News aired after the credits of five NBC Saturday morning shows.

Sunday

By network

ABC

Returning series
ABC Weekend Special
ABC World News This Morning
ABC World News Tonight
All My Children
American Bandstand
The Edge of Night
Family Feud
General Hospital
Good Morning America
The Love Boat 
One Life to Live
Ryan's Hope
Schoolhouse Rock!
Super Friends
This Week with David Brinkley

New series
Loving
The Mork & Mindy/Laverne & Shirley/Fonz Hour
The Pac-Man/Little Rascals/Richie Rich Show
The Puppy's New Adventures
The Scooby & Scrappy-Doo/Puppy Hour
Too Close For Comfort 

Canceled/Ended
Animals, Animals, Animals
The Fonz and the Happy Days Gang
Goldie Gold and Action Jack
Heathcliff & Marmaduke
Issues and Answers
Kids Are People Too
Laverne & Shirley in the Army
The Richie Rich/Scooby-Doo Show and Scrappy Too!
Thundarr the Barbarian

CBS

Returning series
The $25,000 Pyramid
As the World Turns
Blackstar 
The Bugs Bunny/Road Runner Show
Capitol
Captain Kangaroo
CBS Children's Film Festival
CBS Evening News
CBS Morning News
CBS News Sunday Morning
Face the Nation
Guiding Light
The New Fat Albert Show
The Kwicky Koala Show 
The Popeye and Olive Comedy Show
The Price Is Right
Speed Buggy 
Sunrise Semester
Tattletales
The Young and the Restless

New series
Child's Play
The Dukes
Gilligan's Planet
Meatballs and Spaghetti
The New $25,000 Pyramid
Pandamonium
Sylvester & Tweety, Daffy, and Speedy Show

Canceled/Ended
30 Minutes
Alice 
Drak Pack 
The New Adventures of Mighty Mouse and Heckle and Jeckle 
One Day at a Time 
Search for Tomorrow (moved to NBC)
The Tarzan/Lone Ranger/Zorro Adventure Hour
The Tom and Jerry Comedy Show
Trollkins

NBC

Returning series
Another World
Days of Our Lives
Diff'rent Strokes 
The Doctors
The Jetsons 
Meet the Press
NBC Nightly News
The New Adventures of Flash Gordon
Sale of the Century
Search for Tomorrow
The Smurfs
Spider-Man and His Amazing Friends
Texas
Thundarr the Barbarian 
Today
Wheel of Fortune

New series
Dream House
The Facts of Life 
Fantasy
The Flintstone Funnies
The Gary Coleman Show
Hit Man
The Incredible Hulk
Just Men!
NBC News at Sunrise
The New Battlestars
Shirt Tales

Canceled/Ended
Battlestars
Blockbusters (revived in 1986-87)
The Bullwinkle Show 
CHiPs 
The Daffy/Speedy Show
The Flintstones Comedy Show 
The Kid Super Power Hour with Shazam!
Gambit (renamed Las Vegas Gambit)
Password Plus
The Regis Philbin Show
Space Stars

See also
1982-83 United States network television schedule (prime-time)
1982-83 United States network television schedule (late night)

Sources
https://web.archive.org/web/20071015122215/http://curtalliaume.com/abc_day.html
https://web.archive.org/web/20071015122235/http://curtalliaume.com/cbs_day.html
https://web.archive.org/web/20071012211242/http://curtalliaume.com/nbc_day.html

References

United States weekday network television schedules
1982 in American television
1983 in American television